George, son of Cronik was a nobleman in the Kingdom of Hungary, who served as Judge royal in 1138, during the reign of Béla II of Hungary.

Before becoming Judge royal, George functioned as ispán of Zala County in 1137. His authority increasingly separated from the Palatine's who are increasingly dealt with national issues, while Judge royal George handled the affairs of the royal court. His name is mentioned by only one royal charter issued in September 1138, when a certain Fila donated his Örs estate to the chapter of Veszprém.

References

Sources
  Markó, László: A magyar állam főméltóságai Szent Istvántól napjainkig – Életrajzi Lexikon (The High Officers of the Hungarian State from Saint Stephen to the Present Days – A Biographical Encyclopedia) (2nd edition); Helikon Kiadó Kft., 2006, Budapest; .
  Zsoldos, Attila (2011). Magyarország világi archontológiája, 1000–1301 ("Secular Archontology of Hungary, 1000–1301"). História, MTA Történettudományi Intézete. Budapest. 

Judges royal
12th-century Hungarian people